Amshinov (Yiddish: אמשינאוו) is a Polish Hasidic dynasty founded in the town of Mszczonów, Poland, by Yaakov Dovid Kalish, the son of Israel Yitzhak Kalish. Amshinov is a branch of Warka Hasidism, which in part is a branch of Peshischa Hasidism, as Israel Yitzhak Kalish was a leading disciple of Simcha Bunim of Peshischa (1765-1827).

History 

The first Amshinover rebbe, Yaakov Dovid Kalish, was a son of the first Vurker rebbe, Israel Yitzhak Kalish of Warka.

Kalish died in 1878 and was succeeded as Amshinover Rebbe by one of his sons, Menachem Kalish.

When Menachem Kalish died in 1917 his son Yosef became the rebbe in Amshinov, and his other son, Shimon Sholom, became rebbe in Otwock ( Otvotsk). He was involved in the exodus of thousands of young men in Kletzk, Radin, Novhardok, and other yeshivas via Japan to Shanghai at the outbreak of World War II. By the time Shanghai came under Japanese control, it held 26,000 Jews.

Shimon Sholom's son Yerachmiel Yehuda Myer Kalish (1901–1976) of Amshinov, was born in Przysucha ( Pshiskhe), Poland. He studied Torah with his grandfather, Menachem Kalish.

After the war, Shimon moved to the United States. Upon his death in 1954 (י"ט אב תשי"ד), his son accompanied his body to Tiberias in Israel, and remained in Israel, later movimg to Tel Aviv, and then to the Bayit Vegan neighbourhood of Jerusalem.

21st century rebbes

Jerusalem 

Yaakov Aryeh Yeshaya Milikowsky, the Amshinover rebbe in the Bayit Vegan section of Jerusalem, was born in the United States and was named after his ancestor Yaakov Aryeh Guterman of the hasidic dynasty of Radzymin. He is the son of Yerachmiel Yehudah Meir Kalish's daughter  Chayah Nechamah and her husband Chaim Milikowsky.

In 2015 he founded an organization called Tzedaka V'chesed Amshinov as a charity in memory of Rabbi Meir Ba'al HaNes.

New York 
Yosef Kalish II was the previous Amshinover rebbe in the Boro Park section of Brooklyn, New York City. He was the son of Yitzchak Kalish, the son of Yosef Kalish. He died on April 5, 2020, at the age of 63, from COVID-19.

His two children succeeded him: the older, Menachem Kalish, became the rebbe in Boro Park and the younger, Osher Chaim Kalish, in Bet Shemesh.

Lineage of the Amshinov dynasty

References

External links 
A collection of pictures of the previous Amshinover Rebbe with Hebrew captions

Hasidic dynasties of Poland
Orthodox Judaism in Poland
Hasidic dynasties headquartered in Jerusalem